Blue Mountain Lake is an affluent hamlet in the town of Indian Lake of Hamilton County, New York, United States, at the intersection of New York Routes 28, 28N and 30. Blue Mountain Lake also refers to the lake on the banks of which the hamlet is situated. The place is named after the mountain peak, Blue Mountain.

The principal outdoor attractions include camping, boating and hiking, supported by the several guest lodges in the area - at least one of which features and actively promotes the absence of televisions, telephones and radios in their rooms. The Adirondack Museum is located just outside the hamlet of Blue Mountain Lake, within walking distance east on Route 30. The Adirondack Lakes Center for the Arts provides year-round theatre and music performances, art galleries, workshops and classes.

External links 
Adirondack Museum
Blue Mountain Lake Photos 1874-1950
Adirondack Lakes Center for the Arts

Hamlets in New York (state)
Hamlets in Hamilton County, New York